Since Italy's first international association football match in 1910, 26 footballers have scored a hat-trick for the national team.

The first player who scored a hat-trick was Pietro Lana in the 6–2 victory against France on 15 May 1910. The highest individual score in a single match is four goals, which has been achieved by six players: Carlo Biagi, Francesco Pernigo, Omar Sívori, Alberto Orlando, Gigi Riva, and Roberto Bettega. Five players have scored a hat-trick more than once, such as Giuseppe Meazza, Angelo Schiavio, Silvio Piola, Gigi Riva and Paolo Rossi. The highest number of hat-tricks in a single match is three, which occurred during the third place match concerning the 1928 Summer Olympics, related to Italy's 11–3 victory over Egypt where Angelo Schiavio, Elvio Banchero and Mario Magnozzi each scored three goals. Gigi Riva, with three hat-tricks, has scored the highest number of hat-tricks for Italy. 

In the 1982 FIFA World Cup second group stage match, Italy won 3–2 against Brazil thanks to Paolo Rossi who scored a 'famous' hat-trick, allowing Italy to progress to the semi-finals. The most recent hat-trick in an official match was scored by Alberto Gilardino on 14 October 2009, during Italy's victory over Cyprus for the 2010 FIFA World Cup qualification.

Since 1912, Italy have conceded nine hat-tricks. On 17 March 1912, Eugène Maës was the first player to score a hat-trick against Italy in France's 4–3 victory. The last one was scored by Safet Sušić on 13 June 1979, during the 4–1 defeat against Yugoslavia, in a friendly match. John Hansen is the only player who scored four goals against Italy in a 4–1 defeat against Denmark, which took place on 5 August 1948.

Hat-tricks scored by Italy

As of 15 November 2021

Results list Italy's goal tally first.

Hat-tricks conceded by Italy 
Results list Italy's goal tally first

References

External links
Italy national football team hat-tricks at 11v11.com

Hat
Italy
Italy